is a passenger railway station located in the city of Matsuyama, Ehime Prefecture, Japan. It is operated by the private transportation company Iyotetsu.

Lines
During most of the day, railway trains arrive every fifteen minutes. Trains continue from Matsuyama City Station on the Yokogawara Line to Yokogawara Station.

Layout
Yamanishi Station is an above-ground station with a single island platform and two tracks. The station building is located at the end of the platform, and passengers must first exit the ticket gate before crossing the tracks via a level crossing. The station is attended.

History
Yamanishi Station was opened on 1 November 1927 and was originally located in front of Nitta Junior High School and had a sharp S-shaped curve to avoid the village of Komitsumura. It was relocated to its present location on 1 May 1937.

Surrounding area
Nitta High School
Nitta Seiun Secondary School
Matsuyama Municipal Mitsuhama Junior High School

See also
 List of railway stations in Japan

References

External links

Iyotetsu Station Information

Iyotetsu Takahama Line
Railway stations in Ehime Prefecture
Railway stations in Japan opened in 1927
Railway stations in Matsuyama, Ehime